Ithutomus is a genus of moths of the family Yponomeutidae. At least one of its species, Ithutomus valdivianus has a range in the Valdivia region of Chile.

Species
Ithutomus formosus - Butler, 1883 
Ithutomus valdivianus - Beécher and Parra, 1998

References

Yponomeutidae